In the second group stage of the 2001–02 UEFA Champions League, eight winners and eight runners-up from the first group stage were drawn into four groups of four teams, each containing two group winners and two runners-up. Teams from the same country or from the same first round group could not be drawn together. The top two teams in each group advanced to the quarter-finals.

Seeding
Seeding was determined by the UEFA coefficients and participants' first group stage positions. Four best-ranked group winners were seeded in Pot 1, the remaining four in Pot 2. Group runners-up were seeded to Pots 3 and 4 accordingly.

Tie-breaking criteria
Based on Article 7.06 in the UEFA regulations, if two or more teams are equal on points on completion of the group matches, the following criteria will be applied to determine the rankings:
higher number of points obtained in the group matches played among the teams in question;
superior goal difference from the group matches played among the teams in question;
higher number of goals scored away from home in the group matches played among the teams in question;
superior goal difference from all group matches played;
higher number of goals scored;
higher number of coefficient points accumulated by the club in question, as well as its association, over the previous five seasons.

Groups

Group A

Group B

Group C

Group D

Notes

References

Group Stage 2
2001-02 2